Edward Robinson III (born December 7, 1970) is a former American football linebacker, playing one season for the Pittsburgh Steelers in the National Football League (NFL).

Early life and college career 
Ed Robinson was born on December 7, 1970 in DeFuniak Springs, Florida. He played high school football at Walton High School in DeFuniak Springs. He then played in college at Florida, where he was a team captain.

Professional career 
Robinson went undrafted in the 1994 NFL Draft. He spent one year in the NFL with the Pittsburgh Steelers, recording 8 solo tackles and one assisted tackle.

References 

1970 births
American football linebackers
Walton High School (DeFuniak Springs, Florida) alumni
Florida Gators football players
Living people
People from DeFuniak Springs, Florida
Pittsburgh Steelers players
Players of American football from Florida